Nahio is a town in west-central Ivory Coast. It is a sub-prefecture of Issia Department in Haut-Sassandra Region, Sassandra-Marahoué District.

Nahio was a commune until March 2012, when it became one of 1126 communes nationwide that were abolished.

In 2014, the population of the sub-prefecture of Nahio was 27,034.

Villages
The 7 villages of the sub-prefecture of Nahio and their population in 2014 are:
 Bogbam (11 307)
 Kridakozahio (1 273)
 Nahio (3 271)
 Nakiahio (1 771)
 Takouahio (2 349)
 Tézié (6 055)
 Zézahio (1 008)

Notes

Sub-prefectures of Haut-Sassandra
Former communes of Ivory Coast